

Events calendar

+5